"Ring Out Wild Bells" is a 1965 Australian television play which aired as part of Wednesday Theatre. It was based on a play by. It was the third locally shot ABC drama after Vacancy in Vaughan Street and Dark Brown.

Plot
Conflict emerges between a minister, Reverend Stephen Millcote, and race promoter Peter Lambert. Millcote is trying to conduct marriage services on Saturday afternoons while Lambert is running race meetings, complete with loudspeaker commentaries, from close by. Matters are complicated by the fact that Millcote's daughter is in love with Lambert's son.

Cast
Edward Howell as Reverend Stephen Millcote
Belly Ross as Pamela Millcote, Millcote's sister and horse racing fan
James Stevens as Peter Lambert
Alistair Smart as John Lambert
Monica Smith as Judy Millcote
Gwen Wheeler as Alice Lambert
Beverly Bates as Beverly
Larry Pratt as announcer

Production
It was based on the 1958 play by George Landen Dann. It was Dann's first TV play produced although he had written a number of radio and stage plays. It aired in Melbourne the same week as another Brisbane shot play, The Quiet Season.

It was filmed at the ABC's Brisbane studios in Toowong and broadcast in Brisbane. All the cast were local Brisbane actors except for Edward Howell; this was his 45th TV play. Betty Ross was experienced in Brisbane theatre. Larry Pratt the ABC radio announcer provided his voice for the role of the race caller.

Reception
The Sydney Morning Herald said "its dialogue consisted of a great deal of characterless and self consciously conventional prattle which reduced the play to the level of a soap opera domestic upheaval and gave the Brisbane cast of actors no chance of proving themselves. The standards were close to church hall dramatics and only in Edward Howell was it possible to recognise an authoritative actor who had succeeded in kindling the beginnings of a live part out of the cardboard figure of the vicar."

See also
Vacancy in Vaughan Street (1963)
Dark Brown (1963)
The Quiet Season (1965)
The Absence of Mr Sugden (1965)
Arabesque for Atoms (1965)
A Sleep of Prisoners (1961)
The Monkey Cage (1966)

References

External links
 TV production at AustLit
 Original play at AustLit
 Ring Out Wild Bells at Ausstage

1965 television plays
1965 Australian television episodes
1960s Australian television plays
Wednesday Theatre (season 1) episodes